Pseudophaloe is a genus of tiger moths in the family Erebidae. The genus was described by Hering in 1925.

Species

Pseudophaloe cerealia (Druce, 1884)
Pseudophaloe helotes (Druce, 1884)
Pseudophaloe isosoma (Prout, 1920)
Pseudophaloe latifascia Hering, 1925
Pseudophaloe ninonia (Druce, 1884)
Pseudophaloe patula (Walker, 1854)
Pseudophaloe promiscua Becker & Espinosa, 2013
Pseudophaloe schausii (H. Edwards, 1884)
Pseudophaloe stenoxantha Hering, 1925
Pseudophaloe tellina (Weymer, 1895)
Pseudophaloe tellinoides Hering, 1925
Pseudophaloe tessmanni Hering, 1925
Pseudophaloe triangulata (Dognin, 1919)
Pseudophaloe troetschi (Druce, 1884)
Pseudophaloe xiphydria Zerny, 1928

References

External links

Pseudophaloe
Pericopina
Moth genera